RKC Waalwijk is a Dutch professional football club based in Waalwijk, that is currently competing in the Eredivisie. Its name is derived from 'Rooms Katholieke Combinatie' ('Roman Catholic Combination' in Dutch) and was established as a merger of HEC, WVB and Hercules.

History
The club was formed on 26 August 1940 and used to play its home games at Sportpark Olympia. Its new stadium, the 7,500 seater Mandemakers Stadion was opened in 1996 and featured the home match against Roda JC. RKC's clubname was also expanded with the name of the town before that 1996-97 season. While considered one of the Eredivisie's smaller clubs, it nevertheless maintained its top flight status for many years. Its home colors are yellow and blue.

At the end of the 2006–07 season, RKC Waalwijk were relegated from the Eredivisie after a defeat in play-offs against VVV-Venlo.

On 3 June 2009 they were promoted to the Eredivisie division after a win in the play-offs against De Graafschap. Though, their spell didn't last long ending in the last place with only 15 points. In the season followed they would finish first in the Eerste Divisie promoting back in the top flight of Dutch football.

After another relegation at the end of the 2013–14 season, RKC Waalwijk finished 20th (last) in the 2014–15 season of Eerste Divisie. However, they didn't relegate to Topklasse (amateurs) because both of the two Topklasse champions declined promotion into professionalism. In 2016–17, they made the Eerste Divisie playoffs, losing 5–2 on aggregate to FC Emmen.

In the 2017–18 season, RKC was placed 16th out of 20 teams in the Eerste Divisie. In 2019, Waalwijk promoted back to the Eredivisie after a five-year absence, after beating Go Ahead Eagles in the play-off finals. After a 0–0 draw in the first leg at home, RKC won the second leg 4–5 away.

In the 2019–20 season, RKC finished in last place, but they survived relegation due to the season being declared void due to the COVID-19 pandemic. In the subsequent 2020–21 season, the club managed to avoid relegation on their own by finishing in 15th place.

Results

Below is a table with RKC's domestic results since the introduction of professional football in 1984.

RKC in Europe 
 Group = group game
 1R = first round
 2R = second round
 3R = third round
 1/8 = 1/8 final

Current squad

Out on loan

Honours
Eerste Divisie
Champions (2): 1987–88, 2010–11

Club officials

Former coaches

  Wim Klaassen (1968–71)
  Jan Remmers (1974–80)
  Leen Looijen (1985–86)
  Leo van Veen (July 1, 1986 – June 30, 1993)
  Hans Verèl (July 1, 1993–Dec 18, 1993)
  Bert Jacobs (Dec 18, 1993–June 30, 1995)
  Leo van Veen (July 1, 1995 – June 30, 1996)
  Cees van Kooten (July 1, 1996–Oct 12, 1996)
  Bert Jacobs (Oct 12, 1996–June 30, 1997)
  Peter Boeve (July 1, 1997–Oct 26, 1998)
  Martin Jol (Oct 26, 1998–June 30, 2004)
  Erwin Koeman (July 1, 2004 – June 30, 2005)
  Adrie Koster (July 1, 2005–Nov 27, 2006)
  Mark Wotte (Nov 27, 2006–June 20, 2007)
  Željko Petrović (July 1, 2007 – June 30, 2008)
  Ruud Brood (July 1, 2008 – June 30, 2012)
  Erwin Koeman (July 1, 2012 – June 30, 2014)
   Martin Koopman (July 1, 2014 – February 11, 2015)
   Peter van den Berg (February 12, 2015 - January 7, 2018)
   Hans de Koning (January 7, 2018 - June 30, 2018)
   Fred Grim (July 8, 2018 - June 30, 2021)
   Joseph Oosting (July 1, 2021 -)

See also
Dutch football league teams

References

External links

 

 
Association football clubs established in 1940
1940 establishments in the Netherlands
Football clubs in the Netherlands
Football clubs in Waalwijk